Randers railway station is a railway station serving the town of Randers in the East Jutland metropolitan area, Denmark.

The station is located on the Aarhus-Aalborg Line from Aarhus to Aalborg, and opened in 1862. It offers direct InterCityLyn and InterCity services to Copenhagen and Aalborg. The train services are operated by DSB.

History 

Randers station was opened in 1862 with the opening of the Aarhus-Randers railway line from Aarhus to Randers. In 1869, Randers Station also became the southern terminus of the Randers-Aalborg railway line.

In 1876, Randers Station also became the western terminus of the new Randers-Ryomgård railway line. From 1951, all trains on the Randers-Hadsund railway line (opened in 1883) were continued from Hadsundbanegården station in the eastern part of the city via a connecting track along the harbour to Randers Station. The Randers-Hadsund Line was closed in 1969, while passenger traffic on the Randers-Ryomgård Line stopped in 1971, with freight service on the line continuing until 1993.

Architecture 
The original station building was designed by an unknown architect in 1862. It has been substantially rebuilt since then. The building was last renovated in 2007.

Operations 

The train services are operated by DSB. The station offers direct InterCityLyn and InterCity services to Copenhagen and Aalborg.

See also 
 List of railway stations in Denmark
 Rail transport in Denmark

References

Bibliography

External links

 Banedanmark – government agency responsible for maintenance and traffic control of most of the Danish railway network
 DSB – largest Danish train operating company
 Danske Jernbaner – website with information on railway history in Denmark
 Nordjyllands Jernbaner – website with information on railway history in North Jutland

Randers
Railway stations opened in 1862
Railway stations in the Central Denmark Region
1862 establishments in Denmark
Railway stations in Denmark opened in the 19th century